Kakatiya Thermal Power Station is located near  Chelpur village of Ghanpur mandal in Warangal district of  the Indian state of Telangana. The power plant is one of the coal based power plants of TSGENCO

Plant
This power plant was developed in 2 stages. The first stage comprised one 500MW unit. The unit was synchronized to grid with oil firing on 31.03.2010 at 06:08 hrs. Coal firing was immediately taken up and the load was raised up to 84 MW and the unit was in service with this load for about 1 hour.

Kakatiya TPP Unit-II 1X600MW, was synchronized to the grid at 03:00 hrs. on 22 October 2015 and loaded to 105 MW.

Capacity

See also 

 List of Power Stations in Telangana

References 

Coal-fired power stations in Telangana
Hanamkonda district
2010 establishments in Andhra Pradesh